Daria Kolosovskaya  (born 19 April 1996) is a Russian professional basketball player.

Career

Europe
In 2014, Kolosovskaya began her professional career with Sparta&K Moscow, playing in the Russian Premier League and the EuroCup. Here she played alongside the likes of Stefanie Dolson and Emma Meesseman. Kolosovskaya remained a part of the roster for both the 2015–16 and 2016–17 seasons.

National team

Youth level
Kolosovskaya made her international debut at the 2012 FIBA Europe Under-16 Championship in Hungary, where Russia took home the bronze. In 2013, Kolosovskaya moved up to the FIBA Europe Under-18 Championship in Croatia, where Russia placed fifth. Kolosovskaya returned to the Under-18s in 2014, helping lead Russia to Gold. Kolosovskaya was then named to the national team for the 2015 FIBA Under-19 World Championship in her home nation. Russia would remain undefeated until the final, falling to the United States and taking home silver. Kolosovskaya was awarded a place on the All-Tournament Team.

Senior level
In 2016, Kolosovskaya made her senior international debut at the qualifiers for EuroBasket 2017. In her debut showings, Kolosovskaya averaged 5.3 points per game and 2.3 assists per game. However, Kolosovskaya failed to make Russia's final roster for EuroBasket Women 2017 in the Czech Republic.

References

1996 births
Living people
Russian women's basketball players
Forwards (basketball)
Competitors at the 2019 Summer Universiade
People from Bratsk
Sportspeople from Irkutsk Oblast